The Arabian jird (Meriones arimalius)  is a species of rodent in the family Muridae.
It is found in Oman, Saudi Arabia and United Arab Emirates.

References

Meriones (rodent)
Mammals described in 1924
Taxonomy articles created by Polbot
Mammals of the Arabian Peninsula